QQQ is an Australian television station broadcasting in remote eastern, southern and central areas of Australia.

QQQ may also refer to:

 Frontier in Space, a 1973 Doctor Who serial with production code QQQ
 Triple quadrupole mass spectrometer (QqQ), a mass spectrometer comprising three consecutive quadrupoles
 QQQ, an exchange-traded fund (ETF) based on the Nasdaq-100 Index founded by Invesco PowerShares
 A Morse code signal for unknown attacker, used in conjunction with SOS

See also
 QQQQ (disambiguation)
 QQ (disambiguation)
 Q (disambiguation)